Nørreport station is an S-train, metro and main line railway station in Copenhagen, Denmark. It is located in the district of Indre By, and is named after the historic Nørreport city gate, at the original location of which it is located. It is one of the busiest railway stations in Denmark, serving 165,000 people daily. The entire station is underground, with three pairs of platforms: one for S-trains, one for main line trains and one for the metro. The station is located on the Boulevard Line of the S-train and main line network. Several bus lines run through and start from Nørreport above ground.

Located in fare zone 1, it serves lines M1 and M2 of the Metro, most S-train lines, regional trains to Zealand and southern Sweden, intercity trains to Esbjerg and international trains to Malmö and Gothenburg, Sweden, and trains to other places, but not express trains. The station has bicycle parking facilities, and bicycles are allowed on board the trains, but not during rush hours.

History
The station opened on 1 July 1918, as part of the tunnel which would connect the stations Østerport and Copenhagen Central Station. S-train service began on 15 May 1934.

In order to let passengers easily change from S-trains and regional trains to the Metro and vice versa, a tunnel was constructed to connect the train platforms with the Metro platforms. The S-train platforms were therefore closed partially from March 2000 to February 2002, allowing only the front-most four doors to open at the station.

With the opening of the first phase of the Metro on 19 October 2002, Nørreport station started serving M1 and M2. The station was the original terminus until it moved to Frederiksberg when phase 2A opened on 29 May 2003.

Plans

The current station building is worn down and dimly lit, and the air quality is poor because of diesel trains, at least on the regional train platform. Passengers also have to cross busy streets to access the station. Therefore, DSB has presented a proposal for a new station. One of the adjacent roads will be pedestrianised, thereby make the station easier to access. A new glass roof at ground level will allow more light into the station. The new station design would also improve air quality thanks to a new ventilation system.

The proposal is a product of discussions between DSB, the Greater Copenhagen Authority and the Copenhagen Municipality. The decision to go ahead was made in 2009 and the rebuilding takes place between 2011 and 2016. The S-train platform has been renovated and remains open. The platforms for regional and intercity trains are undergoing renovation and are estimated to remain closed until April 2014.

Services

References

External links

 Nørreport Metro station on www.m.dk 
 Nørreport Metro station on www.m.dk 
 Nørreport Railway station on www.dsb.dk 

M1 (Copenhagen Metro) stations
M2 (Copenhagen Metro) stations
Railway stations in Copenhagen
S-train (Copenhagen) stations
Railway stations opened in 1918
Knud Tanggaard Seest railway stations
Railway stations in Denmark opened in the 20th century